Hans-Jürgen Salewski (born 23 August 1956) is a former professional German footballer.

Salewski made 146 2. Fußball-Bundesliga appearances during his footballing career, plus one appearance for Eintracht Braunschweig in Germany's top flight during the 1979–80 campaign.

References

External links 
 

1956 births
Living people
German footballers
Association football midfielders
Bundesliga players
2. Bundesliga players
FC Schalke 04 players
SC Westfalia Herne players
SC Preußen Münster players
Eintracht Braunschweig players
Tennis Borussia Berlin players